Hiidentorni / Perimä Vihassa Ja Verikostossa is a compilation by the black metal band Horna. It was released on Woodcut Records in 2000.

Track listing
Disc 1 
Avaus / Kun Lyömme Jumalan Kodin Liekkeihin 05:39
Hiidentorni Huokuu Usvansa 04:31
Ikuisesti, Kalpeina Kuoleman Muistoina 05:14
Tappakaa Kristus 02:50
Sanoista... Pimeyteen 02:42
Hänen Synkkä Myrskynsä 08:05
Hornanväki 06:20
Sinulle Mätänevä Jehova 04:48
Örkkivuorilla 04:01
Imperial Devastation 05:36
Sword Of Darkness 04:45
White Aura Buried In Ashes 04:52
Sormus Ja Silmä 13:07
Disc 2
Pimeys Ylla Pyhan Maan 04:11
Verikammari 06:30
Ghash Inras 05:15
Perimä Vihassa Ja Verikostossa 07:56
Korpin Hetki 03:36
Ihmisviha 03:10
Kun Synkka Ikuisuus Avautuu 03:26
Black Metal Sodomy 02:15
Ordo Regnum Sathanas 16:15

External links
Metal Archives
Official Horna Site

Horna albums
2000 compilation albums